Nickel Creek is an album by the acoustic/newgrass trio Nickel Creek.  The group had released two albums prior to this; however, their earlier albums are no longer in print, and the band redefined their style before the release of Nickel Creek. It was released by Sugar Hill Records, and produced by bluegrass star Alison Krauss.

Track listing

Original album cover 
The album was originally released with a different cover photo which featured fourth band member Scott Thile. He was also mentioned more extensively in the album credits. Upon his departure from the band, the album was reprinted with a new photo which featured the remaining three members of the band, and Scott's credits were lessened slightly to simply indicate his performance on the individual songs.

Other than photography and booking credits, the track listings, performances, and all other credits are identical on both releases.

Charts and Certifications

Weekly charts

Year-end charts

Certifications

Personnel 
 Chris Thile - mandolin, banjo, bouzouki, lead and harmony vocals
 Sara Watkins - fiddle, strings, violin, lead and harmony vocals
 Sean Watkins - guitar, mandolin, lead and harmony vocals
 Scott Thile - electric and acoustic bass guitars, upright bass

Production 

 Producer: Alison Krauss
 Recorded at Seventeen Grand and The Brown Cloud
 Mixed at the Doghouse
 Engineer: Gary Paczosa
 Assistant engineers: Bobby Morse, Sandy Jenkins, Thomas Johnson
 Mastering: Doug Sax
 Digital editing: Chuck Turner
 Photography: Jim McGuire (original release), Brent Hedgecock (re-release)
 Design: Sue Meyer
 Booking: Andrea Compton (original release), William Morris Agency (re-release)

References 

Nickel Creek albums
2000 albums
Sugar Hill Records albums
Albums produced by Alison Krauss